Balaji Rajan from the Indian Institute of Science, Bangalore, India was named Fellow of the Institute of Electrical and Electronics Engineers (IEEE) in 2014 for contributions to high performance and low complexity space-time code designs for wireless communication systems.

References 

Fellow Members of the IEEE
Living people
Year of birth missing (living people)
Place of birth missing (living people)